The Division of Murray was an Australian Electoral Division in the state of Victoria. It was located in the north of the state, adjoining the Murray River, which forms Victoria's border with New South Wales. It included the towns of Shepparton, Echuca, Cobram, Yarrawonga, Boort and Bridgewater. In 2018 the division was renamed the Division of Nicholls, coming into effect at the 2019 federal election.

History

The Division was proclaimed at the redistribution of 11 May 1949, and was first contested at the 1949 election. It was named after the Murray River, which itself was named after British Secretary of State for War and the Colonies Sir George Murray. It was first held by John McEwen, who briefly served as Prime Minister after the disappearance of Harold Holt, and subsequently became the inaugural Deputy Prime Minister under John Gorton. His successor in the seat, Bruce Lloyd, went on to serve as deputy leader to three successive Nationals leaders - Ian Sinclair, Charles Blunt and Tim Fischer.

Murray was in the hands of either the Liberal or National parties for its entire existence. At the time of its abolition, it was the third-safest coalition-held seat in Australia, with a 20-point swing required for Labor to win it.

In 2018 the division was renamed the Division of Nicholls, coming into effect at the 2019 federal election.

Members

Election results

References

External links
 Division of Murray - Australian Electoral Commission

Former electoral divisions of Australia
Constituencies established in 1949
Constituencies disestablished in 2019
1949 establishments in Australia
2019 disestablishments in Australia